Lobulogobius is a small genus of gobies native to the Indian Ocean and the western Pacific Ocean.

Species
There are currently three recognized species in this genus:
 Lobulogobius bentuviai Goren, 1984
 Lobulogobius morrigu Larson, 1983
 Lobulogobius omanensis Koumans, 1944 (Oman goby)

References

Gobiidae